The Estadio Sudamericano Félix Capriles is a multi-purpose stadium in Cochabamba, Bolivia.  It is currently used mostly for football matches.  The stadium has a  maximum capacity of 32,000. It is the home stadium of Club Jorge Wilstermann and Club Aurora. It is also used for bigger concerts, political rallies, and other public events held in the city of Cochabamba.

Events 

 Final of the Copa America 1963 - Bolivia defeated Brazil 5-4.
 One of the sites for the Copa America 1997

References

Felix Capriles
Club Aurora
C.D. Jorge Wilstermann
Felix Capriles
Multi-purpose stadiums in Bolivia
Buildings and structures in Cochabamba